Follower is a novel by Stephen Gallagher published in 1984.

Plot summary
Follower is a novel in which the fylgja, an ancient demonic deathwish, stalks the members of the Teamverk survey at Tromstad mine.

Reception
Colin Greenland reviewed Follower for Imagine magazine, and stated that " He keeps the gunk and gore to a bare minimum, and screws the emotional tension up tight from the first, so that you really care about the characters and their perils, supernatural and otherwise. It is the precision of his plotting and his close attention to detail that makes the horror matter."

References

1984 British novels